Egil Anders Wyller (24 April 1925 – 6 March 2021) was a Norwegian philosopher, historian, non-fiction writer and translator. He was born in Stavanger, the son of Trygve Christian Wyller and Anne Kathrine Dons, and brother of Thomas Christian Wyller. He was assigned professor at the University of Oslo from 1969. Among his books are Tidsproblemet hos Olaf Bull from 1958 and Enhet og annethet from 1981. He has translated dialogues of Plato into Norwegian language, and been a co-editor of the book series Idé og tanke. He was decorated Knight, First Class of the Order of St. Olav in 2000.

References

1925 births
2021 deaths
Writers from Stavanger
Norwegian philosophers
20th-century Norwegian historians
Academic staff of the University of Oslo
Order of Saint Olav